Live Underslunky is a live album by the Ozric Tentacles. The album was originally released in 1992 on Dovetail Records, and it has been re-released in 2003 by Snapper Music.

Track listing
 "Dots Thots" (Ed Wynne) – 7:54
 "Og-Ha-Be" (Ed Wynne) – 9:28
 "Erpland" (Ed Wynne) – 5:32
 "White Rhino Tea" (Ozric Tentacles) – 5:48
 "Bizarre Bazaar" (Ozric Tentacles) – 4:04
 "Sunscape" (Ozric Tentacles) – 7:50
 "Erpsongs" (Ed Wynne) – 3:49
 "Snake Pit" (Ed Wynne, Mervin Pepler) – 3:22
 "Kick Muck" (Ozric Tentacles) – 5:18
 "O-I" (Ozric Tentacles) – 4:59
 "Ayurvedic" (Ozric Tentacles) – 14:46

All tracks performed at The Cambridge (Junction) Theatre on November, 25th, except tracks 5, 7, 10 and 11 performed at The Manchester International 2 on November, 23rd 1991.

Personnel
Ed Wynne: Guitar, Synths
Joie Hinton: Synths
John Egan: Flute
Mervin Pepler: Drums
Zia Geelani: Bass

References

Ozric Tentacles albums
1992 live albums